Monica Puig was the defending champion, having won the event in 2012, but decided not to participate this year.

Aliaksandra Sasnovich won the tournament, defeating Sofia Arvidsson in the final, 6–1, 5–7, 6–4.

Seeds

Main draw

Finals

Top half

Bottom half

References 
 Main draw

Internationaux Feminins de la Vienne - Singles